Connie Booth is an American business executive as vice-president of Product Development at Sony Interactive Entertainment and advocate of many of SIE's first-party franchises starting with Crash Bandicoot. She was inducted into the Academy of Interactive Arts & Sciences Hall of Fame.

Education 
Booth attended California Polytechnic State University – San Luis Obispo and received her Bachelor of Science (B.S.) in Business Administration.

Career 
Booth began her career at Sony Corporation of America in 1989, holding various positions within Sony Electronic Publishing Company. She joined Sony Computer Entertainment America in 1995 as a Producer and Executive Producer of Product Development, working closely with Naughty Dog and Universal Interactive Studios to release Crash Bandicoot, whose star became one of PlayStation’s most recognizable characters.

AIAS president Meggan Scavio said "For over two decades, she has been a leading voice and advocate for countless PlayStation franchises as well as nurturing new talent in the industry. Her tireless work and passion have had an indelible impact on game makers, allowing their creative visions to flourish."

Booth has worked to incubate younger talent in the industry, including assisting Pixelopus, the developers behind PS4 exclusive Concrete Genie.

References 

Year of birth missing (living people)
Living people
American business executives
Women in the video game industry
California Polytechnic State University alumni